Kevin Dean may refer to:
 Kevin Dean (cricketer) (born 1976), English cricketer
 Kevin Dean (ice hockey) (born 1969), American ice hockey player
 Kevin Dean (musician) (born 1971), drummer for Brand New Sin